Ensdorf is a municipality in the district of Saarlouis, in Saarland, Germany.

References

Saarlouis (district)